The discography of the Emery, an American post-hardcore band, consists of seven studio albums, four extended plays and one box set. The band's first extended play, The Columbus EEP Thee, was released in 2002 and failed to rank on the national chart. Emery released their second extended play, The Weak's End EP, in 2004 to help them become noticed by record labels.

After signing a contract with Tooth & Nail, the band released its debut album The Weak's End in the United States in January 2004. In the subsequent year, the band released its second album, The Question. It became their most successful album in the US, reaching No. 45. To promote the album they released the extended play The Question Pre-Sale Exclusive. Emery released their third studio album, I'm Only a Man, in 2007. The album received a four-and-a-half-star review from AllMusic, and charted on the Billboard 200 at No. 78.

Emery's fourth extended play, While Broken Hearts Prevail, was released in 2008 and reached No. 104 in the United States. In the subsequent year, the band released its fourth album, ...In Shallow Seas We Sail; it peaked at No. 50. The band released a box set, Are You Listening?, in 2010. Emery's fifth studio album, We Do What We Want, was released in 2011 and reached No. 76 in the United States. An untitled acoustic album is scheduled for release in 2011.

Albums

Studio albums

Extended plays

Compilations

Music videos

Other appearances

References 
General

 
 

Specific

External links
 
 

Discography
Discographies of American artists